Aluthgama railway station is a railway station on the coastal railway line of Sri Lanka. It is situated between Hettimulla and Bentota railway stations.

In 1887, work commenced on extending the Coastal line, which at that time ran from Colombo to Kaluthara. The extension through to Aluthgama was finished in 1888 but the station at Aluthgama was not opened until 31 March 1890.

Timetable
 Trains to Colombo are available at 3:20 am, 3:50 am, 4:30 am, 5:06 am, 5:25 am, 6:10 am, 6:30 am, 6:38 am, 7:05 am, 7:45 am, 8:16 am, 10:42 am, 11:10 am, 12:13 am, 1:40 pm, 3:46 pm, 4:25 pm and 5:32 pm daily. 
 Trains to Galle are available at 4:20am, 6:05 am, 10:42 am, 6:32 pm, 7:32 pm and 12:20 pm. 
 Trains to Matara are available at 8:28 am, 9:54 am, 11:50 am, 3:43 pm, 4:48 pm, 5:50 pm, and 7:27 pm.

Continuity

References

Railway stations on the Coastal Line
Railway stations in Galle District